Jan Šoupal (October 21, 1892 – November 25, 1964) was a Czech choirmaster, conductor and composer. He is notable particularly as arranger of folk songs for male choirs. Several music schools in Moravia are named in his honor.

References

External links
Short Biography

Czech composers
Czech male composers
Czech conductors (music)
Male conductors (music)
1892 births
1964 deaths
20th-century conductors (music)
20th-century composers
20th-century Czech male musicians